"The Doodle" is the 106th episode of the NBC sitcom Seinfeld. This is the 20th episode for the sixth season and aired on April 6, 1995. In this episode, Jerry's apartment is infested with fleas, George struggles over his girlfriend's opinion of his physical appearance, Kramer indulges his love for Mackinaw peaches, and Elaine loses a literary manuscript that she is expected to review for a job interview.

Plot
Jerry and George are having dinner with their girlfriends, Shelly and Paula. George met Paula at Elaine's drawing class at The New School. George whispers to Jerry that he is eating pecans that were in Shelly's mouth. Jerry spits them out and exclaims his disgust, which angers Shelly. When leaving the restaurant, George finds a doodle that Paula drew of him and thinks it is an ugly caricature. Elaine's friend, Judy, recommends her for a job at Viking Press. In order to stay at the company's suite at the Plaza Hotel she lets Viking Press think she is coming from out of town, and gives Jerry's parents' address in Florida as hers.

George implores Elaine to find out if Paula really likes him. At the drawing class, Paula confesses to Elaine that she likes George and says looks aren't important to her. When Elaine repeats this to George, he becomes upset, thinking it confirms she thinks him ugly. However, he embraces her lack of concern with looks when he realizes it allows him to fulfill his long-held dream of draping himself in velvet.

Jerry gets flea bites. An exterminator confirms the flea infestation, and closes down the apartment for 48 hours to fumigate. Jerry's parents have just come to town; Jerry persuades Elaine to give them the hotel suite. After meeting with Judy, Elaine realizes a manuscript sent from Viking Press for her to read is in Jerry's apartment, and resolves to enter despite the fumigation; an instant later Kramer walks out, having disregarded the sign on the door. Once informed, Kramer worriedly says he spent an hour and a half in the apartment engrossed with a manuscript. Elaine searches inside, but only finds "Chunky" candy bar wrappers. Seeing the wrappers, Jerry realizes it was Newman who gave him fleas. He confronts Newman at his apartment, forcing him to confess.

At the Plaza, Morty, Helen, Uncle Leo and Nana use room service, watch four pay-per-view movies at the same time, and order $100 massages and food. Elaine gets Kramer to summarize the manuscript. Kramer is unable to taste food due to the fumigation exposure. Dismayed that he cannot enjoy Mackinaw peaches, which are ripe for only two weeks a year, he gives his remaining ones to Newman.

Jerry is staying at Shelly's apartment but has forgotten his toothbrush; Shelly tells him to use hers. When he refuses, she throws him out. Elaine has her interview at Viking Press and repeats Kramer's manuscript interpretation. The publisher approves of the interpretation but rejects her due to the astronomical room charges at the Plaza.

George finishes off a Mackinaw peach, discarding the pit on the table. When Paula pops the discarded pit into her mouth to suck out the remaining flavor, he gags with revulsion. Kramer's tastebuds return in time for the peaches; however, Newman finishes the last one in front of him. Kramer exacts revenge by siccing a bulldog on him.

Elaine goes to the hotel room to investigate the charges and finds Uncle Leo in a bathrobe. Upon seeing her, he confusedly says, "They said they were sending over an Asian woman."

Production
Mackinaw peaches are a rare instance of an outright fantasy element in Seinfeld; both the name and the concept of peaches which are ripe for only two weeks were made up by writers Alec Berg and Jeff Schaffer.

Most of Newman's confession was deleted prior to broadcast. In the full version of the scene, he explains that he got the fleas when he was attacked by Buford, the same dog Kramer sics on him later in the episode, which was why he was so terrified of the small dog.

References

External links 
 

Seinfeld (season 6) episodes
1995 American television episodes
Television episodes set in hotels